The Bahamas competed at the 2000 Summer Olympics in Sydney, Australia.

Medalists

Athletics

Men
Track & road events

Women
Track & road events

Field events

Swimming

Men

Tennis

See also
Bahamas at the 1998 Central American and Caribbean Games
Bahamas at the 1999 Pan American Games

References

Official Olympic Reports
International Olympic Committee results database
sports-reference

Nations at the 2000 Summer Olympics
2000
Olympics